1990 Pilcher, provisional designation , is a stony background asteroid from the Florian region of the inner asteroid belt, approximately  in diameter. It was discovered on 9 March 1956, by German astronomer Karl Reinmuth at the Heidelberg-Königstuhl State Observatory in Heidelberg, Germany. In 1982, it was named by the MPC for American physicist and photometrist Frederick Pilcher. The S-type asteroid has a short rotation period of 2.8 hours.

Orbit and classification 

Pilcher is a non-family asteroid of the main belt's background population when applying the hierarchical clustering method (HCM) to its proper orbital elements (Nesvorný, Milani and Knežević). In a previous HCM-analysis (Zappalà) and based on osculating Keplerian orbital elements, the asteroid has also been classified as a member of the Flora family, a giant asteroid family and the largest family of stony asteroids in the main-belt.

It orbits the Sun in the Florian region of the inner asteroid belt at a distance of 2.1–2.3 AU once every 3 years and 3 months (1,171 days; semi-major axis of 2.17 AU). Its orbit has an eccentricity of 0.05 and an inclination of 3° with respect to the ecliptic.

The body's observation arc begins with a precovery taken at Palomar Observatory in June 1950, or six years prior to its official discovery observation at Heidelberg.

Physical characteristics 

In the Tholen classification, Pilcher is a common, stony S-type asteroid.

Rotation period 

In March 2017, a first rotational lightcurve of Pilcher was obtained from photometric observations at the Flarestar Observatory on the island of Malta. Lightcurve analysis gave a short rotation period of 2.842 hours with a brightness amplitude of 0.10 magnitude, indicative for a rather spherical shape.

Diameter and albedo 

According to the survey carried out by the NEOWISE mission of NASA's Wide-field Infrared Survey Explorer, Pilcher measures between 6.754 and 7.273 kilometers in diameter and its surface has an albedo between 0.1864 and 0.215.

The Collaborative Asteroid Lightcurve Link assumes an albedo of 0.24 – derived from 8 Flora, the Flora family's parent body and namesake – and calculates a diameter of 6.39 kilometers based on an absolute magnitude of 13.14.

Naming 

This minor planet was named after American astronomer Frederick Pilcher, a retired professor of Physics at Illinois College and prolific lightcurve photometrist at his Organ Mesa Observatory  in New Mexico. The official naming citation was published by the Minor Planet Center on 8 April 1982.

References

External links 
 Minor Planet Lightcurve Data (Frederick Pilcher), Astronomical Society of Las Cruces (ASLC) 
 Asteroid Lightcurve Database (LCDB), query form (info )
 Dictionary of Minor Planet Names, Google books
 Discovery Circumstances: Numbered Minor Planets (1)-(5000) – Minor Planet Center
 
 

001990
Discoveries by Karl Wilhelm Reinmuth
Named minor planets
001990
19560309